Michael Alexander Williamson (born 26 June 1953) is an Australian former trade union official implicated in the Health Services Union of Australia (HSU) expenses scandal. In October 2013 Williamson pleaded guilty to two charges of fraud totaling nearly 1 million, one charge of fabricating invoices and another charge of recruiting others to hinder a police investigation. The same day that he pleaded guilty, Williamson declared himself bankrupt. An earlier independent report commissioned by the union detailed that companies associated with Williamson and his family had allegedly fraudulently received more than $5 million from the union in period from 2006 to 2011. In the District Court of New South Wales in March 2014, Williamson was sentenced to sevenandahalf years of imprisonment; with a nonparole period of five years.

Biography
Williamson rose to prominence as an official of the HSU, representing the interests of low-paid workers in the health sector in New South Wales and then Australia. Williamson was general secretary of HSU NSW branch, later to become HSUeast, serving in this role between 1997 until June 2012. He was elected as the inaugural national president of the union in 2003 until October 2011. During his term as national president he controversially merged the NSW and two Victorian branches of the union to create HSUeast. He was elected as the national president of the Australian Labor Party, serving between 2009 and 2010; and was a vice president of NSW Labor. Williamson was also a vice president of Unions NSW until April 2012, when he resigned after being asked to explain to its executive why he should not be removed. He was a member of the national executive of the Australian Council of Trade Unions (ACTU); a trustee of First State Super; and a non-executive director of SGE Credit Union, a credit union for NSW Government employees.

Health Services Union expenses affair

Allegations of improprieties in the HSUeast branch were first publicly revealed in The Sydney Morning Herald on 9 September 2011. It was alleged that Craig Thomson (while serving as national secretary of the HSU) and Williamson (as the general secretary of HSUeast) received secret commissions from a major supplier to the union. This was the first occasion that Williamson was implicated in any matter. The media report detailed that Williamson was a director of a computer company, United Edge, that provided information technology services to the HSUeast branch, without going to competitive tender. This decision was made while Williamson was general secretary of HSUeast.

Following the public airing of allegations, Williamson's position as national president of the HSU became untenable, and he was suspended as president in October 2011. In April 2012 he resigned as President from Unions NSW after being asked to explain to its executive why he should not be removed. Williamson's position as the general secretary of HSUeast was dissolved when the Federal Court declared all elected positions vacant in June 2012; appointing an administrator to run the union's affairs.

The final report by Ian Temby  and Dennis Robertson, an accountant, delivered at the request of the HSUeast Union Council in July 2012, made findings that Williamson engaged in irregularities, such as placing family members in union jobs, paying inflated prices for services, and heading United Edge, a company supplying information technology services to the union. Meanwhile, NSW Police officers raided the union's Sydney office on 2 May 2012, seizing documents and computers as part of the "Strike Force Carnarvon" investigation into secret commissions allegedly received by Williamson and Thomson. Williamson was intercepted in a basement attempting to remove a bag of documents.

On 4 October 2012, Williamson was charged with more than 50 offences relating to fraud and obstruction of justice, and was suspended as director of United Edge. Appearing before the Sydney Magistrates Court on 15 October 2013, Williamson entered a guilty plea to four major charges related to cheating and defrauding HSUeast, creating false documents with the intention to deceive and the recruiting of others to hinder a police investigation. All other charges were dropped. No charges were laid against Williamson's wife or family members. On 3 March 2014, legal counsel for Williamson declined to seek a bail extension and Williamson was imprisoned. He was sentenced in the District Court of New South Wales on 28 March 2014 to sevenandahalf years of imprisonment; with a nonparole period of five years, ending in March 2019.

In addition to criminal charges, HSUeast filed civil proceedings against Williamson. Prior to his guilty plea, the union and Williamson reached agreement on the terms of settlement via mediation supervised by Robert McClelland, a former Labor Attorney-General. The terms of the settlement included judgement against Williamson for $5 million in the Supreme Court, set aside his claimed pay rates back to 2003 resulting in the union reducing defined benefits superannuation liabilities to Williamson by approximately $1.1 million; eliminated in excess of $ worth of claimed leave entitlements; and received a public letter of apology to members of the Health Services Union, that the union published:

Following his conviction and imprisonment, on 4 April 2014 the New South Wales branch of the Labor Party expelled Williamson as a member of the party.

References

1953 births
Living people
Australian trade unionists
21st-century Australian criminals
Australian fraudsters
Trade union officials convicted of crimes
Australian prisoners and detainees